Maya Sonenberg is an American short story writer.

Life
She graduated from Wesleyan University, in 1982 and from Brown University, in 1984.
She teaches at University of Washington.

Her work appeared in Gargoyle, Santa Monica Review,

She is a member of the Pacific Northwest Writers' Association.

Awards
 1989 Drue Heinz Literature Prize

Works
After the Death of Shostakovich Pere (Pank Books, 2018) ,
 "Shadow Play." Alaska Quarterly Review (Autumn 2000).
 "Memento Mori." Other Voices 32 (Spring 2000).
 "Noctambus." Gulf Stream (Spring 2000).

Reviews
In this kaleidoscopic set of "fictions," Maya Sonenberg writes stories about memory and desire that are lucid and memorable because she employs so many distinct voices. Yet there are aspects of this collection that will dash a reader's expectations of what a story is – for better or for worse.

References

Year of birth missing (living people)
Living people
Brown University alumni
Wesleyan University alumni
American women writers